Probin Gogoi is an Asom Gana Parishad politician from Assam, India. He was elected to the Assam Legislative Assembly election in 1985, 1996, 2002 and 2006, specifically to the Khumtai constituency. He was the minister of sports and civil supply in the Prafulla Kumar Mahanta cabinet during its first term in 1995.

He died on 12 October 2016 at Guwahati Medical College Hospital, Guwahati, after a prolonged illness. He was 66.

References 

1949 births
2016 deaths
Asom Gana Parishad politicians
Assam MLAs 1985–1991
Assam MLAs 1996–2001
Assam MLAs 2001–2006
Assam MLAs 2006–2011
People from Nagaon district